Tetracha prolongata is a species of tiger beetle that was described by W. Horn in 1932.

References

Beetles described in 1932
Cicindelidae